Sulfuryl chloride fluoride is a chemical compound with the formula SO2ClF.  It is a colorless, easily condensed gas. It is a tetrahedral molecule.

Liquified sulfuryl chloride fluoride is employed as a solvent for highly oxidizing compounds.

Preparation
The laboratory-scale synthesis begins with the preparation of potassium fluorosulfite:
SO2 + KF → KSO2F
This salt is then chlorinated to give sulfuryl chloride fluoride
KSO2F + Cl2 → SO2ClF + KCl
Further heating (180 °C) of potassium fluorosulfite with the sulfuryl chloride fluoride gives sulfuryl fluoride.
KSO2F + SO2ClF → SO2F2 + KCl  +  SO2

Alternatively, sulfuryl chloride fluoride can be prepared without using gases as starting materials by treating sulfuryl chloride with ammonium fluoride or potassium fluoride in trifluoroacetic acid.
SO2Cl2 + NH4F → SO2ClF + NH4Cl

References

Sulfuryl compounds
Sulfur oxohalides
Nonmetal halides
Inorganic solvents